Hobson House may refer to:

Riverview at Hobson Grove, also known as Hobson House, Bowling Green, Kentucky, listed on the National Register of Historic Places (NRHP)
John Hobson House, Astoria, Oregon, listed on the NRHP in Clatsop County, Oregon
William Hobson House, Greensburg, Kentucky, listed on the NRHP in Green County, Kentucky
Hobson-Hill House, Richmond, Utah, listed on the NRHP in Cache County, Utah

See also
Hobson's Choice (Woodbine, Maryland), NRHP-listed
Hobson's Choice (Alberta, Virginia), listed on the NRHP in Brunswick County, Virginia